William D. Middleton (March 25, 1928 – July 10, 2011) was an American reporter, writer and photographer. The majority of his work was on the subject of railroad history and operation. He published over 20 books and approximately 700 articles for magazines and newspapers, accompanied by photographs. His work as a photographer was profiled in the Spring 2011 issue of Classic Trains magazine.

He was one of the lead editors, along with George M. Smerk and Roberta L. Diehl, for the Encyclopedia of North American Railroads.

Published works

Books
During his lifetime, Middleton wrote or co-wrote many books, including:

Magazine articles
During his lifetime, Middleton wrote or co-wrote many articles, including the following:

 Electric Railway Streamliners

References

Citations

Sources 

 
 
 
 
 

1928 births
2011 deaths
People from Davenport, Iowa
20th-century American historians
American male non-fiction writers
Rail transport writers
American male journalists
People from Livingston County, New York
Journalists from New York (state)
Historians from New York (state)
Historians from Iowa
20th-century American male writers